L'Épervier (The Sparrowhawk), is a French drama film from 1933, directed and written by Marcel L'Herbier, starring Charles Boyer and Natalie Paley. The film was based on a play by Francis de Croisset. It was also known in the USA under the title Les Amoureux.

Cast 
 Charles Boyer : Comte Georges de Dasetta
 Natalie Paley : Marina (as Nathalie Paley)
 Marguerite Templey : Madame de Tierrache
 George Grossmith Jr. : Erik Drakton
 Pierre Richard-Willm : René de Tierrache
 Jean Marais : (uncredited)
 Jean Toulout
 Loni Nest
 Viviane Romance
 Gérard Landry
 Christian-Gérard
 Spadolini

References

External links 
 
 L’Épervier (1933) at the Films de France

1933 films
1933 drama films
French drama films
1930s French-language films
Films directed by Marcel L'Herbier
French black-and-white films
French films based on plays
Films based on works by Francis de Croisset
1930s French films